The Itz Valley Autobahn Bridge (German:  Itztalbrücke) is a twin Autobahn bridge carrying the Autobahn A73  across the Itz Valley directly to the south of Autobahn Junction 9 (Rödental exit), and close to Coburg on the northern edge of Bavaria in Germany.   The Autobahn bridge, which has an approximately north-south axis, has been built approximately 25 meters to the west of the Itz Valley Railway Bridge.   However, whereas the Autobahn bridge has been in use since 2007, the railway bridge has been unused since its completion in 2005 because the high speed line of which the railway bridge is part, though started in 1996, has been deprioritised and is not expected to be completed for some time.

Constructed between 2004 and 2007 for a total cost of around €31.5 million, the Autobahn bridge is constructed of pre-stressed steel-concrete box girder sections.

Groundwork and substructure

Superstructure
The concrete beams incorporate 22 internal and 4 external steel reinforcement tendon-supports.

References

Box girder bridges
Road bridges in Germany
Buildings and structures in Coburg
Buildings and structures completed in 2007